Saint Faustinus (died about 15 February 381 A.D.) was bishop of Brescia from c. 360, succeeding Saint Ursicinus. His feast day in the Roman Catholic Church is 15 February: 16 February in the Orthodox Church.

Tradition claims that he was a descendant of Saints Faustinus and Jovita, and that he compiled the Acts of these two martyrs. His relics were discovered in 1101.

Faustinus appeared in the old Roman Martyrology for February 15: "At Brescia, [in the year 350], the holy Confessor Faustinus, Bishop of that see." He is no longer listed in the 2004 revision. This may be because of some doubt that the person existed, or because their cult was never approved.

Works
De Trinitate sive de Fide contra Arianos. Ad Gallam Placidiam
In Codicem Canonum et Constitutorum Eccleasiae Romanae Recepta
Vita Operaque de Faustino
 (with presbyter Marcellinus) Adversus Damasum Libellus Precum Ad Imperatores Valentinianum, Theodosium et Arcadium

References

External links
Saints of February 16: Faustinus of Brescia 
Opera Omnia by Migne Patrologia Latina

4th-century births
Bishops of Brescia
4th-century Italian bishops
Christian hagiographers
381 deaths
4th-century Christian saints
4th-century Latin writers